The athletics competition at the 1935 Central American and Caribbean Games was held in San Salvador, El Salvador.

Medal summary

Men's events

Medal table

References

 
 

1935
Central American and Caribbean Games
1935 Central American and Caribbean Games